Mario Elías Guevara Rivera (born March 1, 1971) is a former Salvadoran professional football player.

Club career
Nicknamed el Jefe (the boss), Guevara started his career at local club Tiburones, then had a lengthy spell at Primera División club Alianza F.C. with whom he won several league titles.

After 10 seasons with them he moved to Once Municipal to become player/coach in 2006, and finished his career with a return to lower league outfit Alba-Ajacutla.

International career
Guevara made his debut for El Salvador in a March 1999 UNCAF Nations Cup match against Guatemala and has earned a total of 18 caps, scoring no goals. He has represented his country in 7 FIFA World Cup qualification matches as well as at the 1999 UNCAF Nations Cup.

His final international game was a September 2004 FIFA World Cup qualification match against Jamaica.

Honours

Player

Club
Alianza F.C.
 Primera División
 Champion: Apertura 1998, Apertura 2001, Clausura 2004
 Runners-up: Clausura 2002

Once Municipal
 Primera División
 Champion: Apertura 2006

References

1971 births
Living people
People from Sonsonate Department
Association football defenders
Salvadoran footballers
El Salvador international footballers
Alianza F.C. footballers
Once Municipal footballers